The second season of Dexter premiered on September 30, 2007, and ended on December 16, 2007. Starting with this season, the show no longer adapts the Dexter novels. The season premiere "It's Alive!" attracted 1.01 million viewers in the United States, making Dexter the first Showtime series to attract more than a million viewers with a season premiere. The season finale, "The British Invasion", attracted 1.4 million viewers, making it the program's most-watched episode until the airing of the season three finale, "Do You Take Dexter Morgan?". Including digital video recorder (DVR) usage, season two was watched by an average of 2.4 million viewers on a weekly basis through 11 full weeks, outperforming season one by 21%.

In the season, the bodies of Dexter's victims are uncovered and an investigation is launched in Dexter's own department to find the killer, dubbed the "Bay Harbor Butcher". During this time, Debra struggles to recover after surviving the Ice Truck Killer's attempt to murder her, and Rita sends Dexter to Narcotics Anonymous meetings when he tells her that he has an "addiction". Sergeant James Doakes (Erik King) stalks Dexter, suspecting that he is connected with the Ice Truck Killer murders. Three new characters are introduced: Keith Carradine appears as Special Agent Frank Lundy, an FBI agent who heads the Bay Harbor Butcher investigation; JoBeth Williams as Rita's mother Gail; and Jaime Murray as Lila Tournay, Dexter's Narcotics Anonymous sponsor.

The season received universal acclaim from critics, and was praised as "one of the best shows on TV this decade" by the Chicago Sun-Times, while Variety considers Hall's portrayal of the title character as a "towering achievement, one that eclipses the show's other shortcomings and rough patches"; the aggregate site Metacritic scored the season at 85 out of 100 based on 11 reviews.

Plot 
Taking place a month after the first-season finale, Dexter has been unable to kill anyone due to Sgt. James Doakes monitoring his activities and his sister Debra now living with him as she recovers from her traumatic experiences concerning Brian, the Ice Truck Killer. Dexter also realizes that he's having trouble killing even when he has the opportunity, due to feelings of guilt over killing his brother Brian.

Rita doubts Dexter's reliability and honesty after finding evidence that he set up her husband Paul to be returned to prison. After her husband dies in a prison fight, Rita confronts Dexter with her suspicions. He admits to setting up Paul but after claiming it was a spontaneous act, cannot explain why he happened to be carrying heroin. Rita incorrectly concludes that Dexter is, like Paul, a drug addict and that this explains his occasional absences and odd behavior. Dexter admits that he does indeed have an addiction (without specifying what that addiction is) and promises to seek help by joining Narcotics Anonymous. There, he meets Lila Tournay, who offers to be his sponsor. Sgt. James Doakes remains suspicious of Dexter's true motives, and constantly monitors Dexter's whereabouts.

Divers accidentally stumble upon Dexter's underwater burial ground, discovering the many bags containing the body parts of his victims. Realizing this dumping ground is the work of a serial killer, the media dubs these bodies the work of the "Bay Harbor Butcher." When it's revealed that each victim was a criminal and killer, some members of the public openly support the Bay Harbor Butcher; the case even inspires the creation of a knife-wielding comic book superhero "The Dark Defender." To oversee the investigation of the Butcher's crimes, an FBI special team is assigned to Miami, led by FBI Special Agent Lundy. Working with Miami Metro PD, Lundy brings in several of the Miami detectives, including Debra, to join his team. Over time, Debra and Lundy become romantically involved.

To ensure he's not identified as the Bay Harbor Butcher, Dexter finds a new dumping area with current that leads to the Atlantic Ocean. He also falsifies records, destroys evidence, and contaminates refrigerated remains to throw the investigators off his trail. Despite this, Lundy narrows down his suspect search to people in Miami with police training. Dexter puts his guilt over Brian behind him and returns to killing. Dexter later learns that his biological mother died because she was a criminal working as a confidential informant for Harry and had an affair with him. Dexter wonders if he was adopted because Harry felt guilty for his mother's death and he also learns that Harry didn't die of natural causes but purposefully overdosed to cause his own death. He doesn't understand why until later in the season.

Doakes becomes confident of Dexter's guilt and confronts him. Dexter then tricks Doakes into assaulting him in the police station, in front of other officers, leading others to side with Dexter that the Sergeant is out of control and causing him to be placed on suspension. Becoming more desperate, Doakes breaks into Dexter's apartment and finds the box of blood samples collected from his victims. However, the investigative team mistakenly concluded that Doakes is the Butcher after finding the box in his car, and Doakes goes into hiding while still tracking Dexter's movements. Lieutenant LaGuerta attempts to vouch for the innocence of her former partner, but Lundy refuses to consider her evidence after he learns that she didn't report previous contact with Doakes during the period he was a fugitive, because of their personal relationship.

Meanwhile, Dexter's relationship with Lila becomes closer as she shows him how to accept who he is.  When Rita discovers Dexter spent an evening in a hotel with Lila, she breaks up with him and Dexter ends up sleeping with Lila for the first time. Dexter learns that Lila is a pyromaniac, at one point purposely setting fire to her apartment and feigning innocence to draw Dexter back to her. When she starts to follow him obsessively, he takes measures to distance himself from her, eventually forgoing their relationship. Realizing he is developing genuine connection to Rita and her children Astor and Cody, Dexter returns to them. Lila is furious and  begins to track Dexter's movements, while also dating Detective Angel Batista. Dexter warns Batista that Lila is not to be trusted but he dismisses the concern. Later, Lila brings rape charges against Batista and tells Dexter she'll drop them if he returns to her. Debra investigates Lila and finds that her real name is Lila West, she is in the country illegally, and she has a criminal history, threatening her with deportation if she doesn't leave Miami.

Dexter tracks down the men responsible for his mother's death. One is dead, one is in jail and one, a drug dealer named Jimenez, is alive. Dexter targets Jimenez and tracks down the dealer's secluded cabin in the nearby swamps, where Dexter kills him. Dexter is called away before he can dispose of the body, but feels confident that the cabin is remote. When he finally goes back, he is unaware that Doakes is following him. Dexter subdues Doakes and locks him in a makeshift cell within the cabin, admitting to the sergeant that he is indeed the Bay Harbor Butcher. Dexter decides that he'll escape the law by convincing others that Doakes is the butcher. He kills a drug lord in the cabin in front of Doakes, shocking the police sergeant. Seeing Doakes' reaction to his actions reminds Dexter of something Harry said days before he died. Dexter suddenly realizes that his father committed suicide because he was ashamed of training Dexter to be a serial killer. Horrified, Dexter tells Doakes, "I killed my father."

While Dexter considers that he must be held responsible for his crimes, Lila takes the GPS device from Dexter's car and uses it to locate the cabin. She finds Doakes, who explains that he is a prisoner of Dexter Morgan, the Bay Harbor Butcher, and needs help. Deciding she now understands Dexter and must help him, Lila leaves Doakes imprisoned and then lights the cabin's gas stove and opens a propane tank. She leaves and Doakes fails to escape, dying in the explosion. Finding Doakes' body and the other evidence Dexter left behind, the FBI concludes that Sgt. Doakes was indeed the Bay Harbor Butcher.

Lila admits her actions to Dexter and reaches out to him. Although he is glad not to be going to jail, Dexter did not intend to kill Doakes since he didn't fit the requirements of "Harry's Code." However, since Lila is a murderer, he plans to kill her since she is too dangerous to his personal life. He pretends that he wants to run away with Lila, but she realizes the truth and kidnaps Rita's children Astor and Cody. At the same time, Debra is on her way to leaving Miami with Lundy rather than letting their relationship end, but then misses the flight when she learns that the children are in danger and Dexter needs her. Lila lures Dexter to her apartment and then sets it on fire with him and the kids still inside. She leaves, sure that they will all die, but Dexter and the children escape. Debra arrives just as Dexter has gotten to safety and decides to remain in Miami after all.

The season concludes with Dexter tracking down Lila to Paris and killing her, avenging Doakes and ensuring that no one alive knows his secret life as a serial killer.

Cast

Main cast 
 Michael C. Hall as Dexter Morgan
 Julie Benz as Rita Bennett
 Jennifer Carpenter as Debra Morgan
 Erik King as James Doakes
 C.S. Lee as Vince Masuka
 Lauren Vélez as María LaGuerta
 David Zayas as Angel Batista
 James Remar as Harry Morgan

Special Guest Stars 
 Keith Carradine as Frank Lundy
 Jaime Murray as Lila West aka Lila Tournay

Recurring cast 
 Preston Bailey as Cody Bennett
 Christina Robinson as Astor Bennett
 Geoff Pierson as Tom Matthews
 Devon Graye, Dominic Janes and Maxwell Huckabee as young Dexter Morgan
 Dave Baez as Gabriel
 Judith Scott as Lt. Esme Pascal
 JoBeth Williams as Gail Brandon
 Tony Amendola as Santos Jimenez
 Sage Kirkpatrick as Laura Moser
 Christian Camargo as Brian Moser
 Margo Martindale as Camilla Figg
 Mark Pellegrino as Paul Bennett
 Tasia Sherel as Francis

Guest cast  
 Matthew Willig as Little Chino
 Jonathan Banks as FBI Deputy Director Max Adams
 Glenn Plummer as Jimmy Sensio
 Don McManus as Roger Hicks
 John Marshall Jones as Curtis Barnes
 Silas Weir Mitchell as Ken Olson

Crew 

Series developer James Manos, Jr. left his first season role as executive producer. First season executive producers John Goldwyn, Sara Colleton and Clyde Phillips all returned for the second season. First season co-executive producer Daniel Cerone was promoted to executive producer for the second season. First season consulting producer Melissa Rosenberg took a staff position as co-executive producer for the second season. Scott Buck joined the crew as a co-executive producer and writer. Robert Lloyd Lewis returned as the on set producer.

First season Story Editor Timothy Schlattmann was promoted to Executive Story Editor for the second season and continued to write episodes. Lauren Gussis was promoted from staff writer to Story Editor and continued to write for the show. Chad Tomasoski, who had not worked on the show since the pilot episode, rejoined the crew as an associate producer.

Episodes

References

External links 
 
 

 
2007 American television seasons